This is the list of all HNK Hajduk Split's European football competitions.

Summary

By competition

Source: UEFA.com, Last updated on 27 August 2022. after match Hajduk - Villarreal 0:2Pld = Matches played; W = Matches won; D = Matches drawn; L = Matches lost; GF = Goals for; GA = Goals against. Defunct competitions indicated in italics.Notes: This summary includes matches played in the Inter-Cities Fairs Cup, which was not endorsed by UEFA and is not counted in UEFA's official European statistics.

By result

Last updated: 27 August 2022. after match Hajduk - Villarreal 0:2
1 Includes seven matches where Hajduk played as hosts away from their home stadium:
1984–85 Cup Winners' Cup first-round game against Dynamo Moscow (2–5 loss) played in Osijek, Croatia on 3 October 1984
1991–92 Cup Winners' Cup first-round game against Tottenham (1–0 win) played in Linz, Austria on 17 September 1991
1993–94 Cup Winners' Cup first-round game against Ajax (1–0 win) played in Ljubljana, Slovenia on 17 September 1993
1995–96 Champions League qualifying round game against Panathinaikos (1–1 draw) played in Rijeka, Croatia on 23 August 1995
1999–2000 qualifying round game against Dudelange (5–0 win) played in Varaždin, Croatia on 12 August 1999
2015–16 Europa League first qualifying round game against Sillamäe Kalev (6–2 win) played in Dugopolje, Croatia on 9 July 2015
2017–18 Europa League second qualifying round game against Levski Sofia (1–0 win) played in Dugopolje, Croatia on 13 July 2017

Matches

Note: Hajduk score always listed first.

2 1960 Mitropa Cup was contested as a competition between countries and there was no elimination.

Record by country
Information correct as of 25 August 2022

Player records
Most appearances in UEFA club competitions: 48 appearances
Vedran Rožić
Top scorers in UEFA club competitions: 16 goals
Zlatko Vujović

UEFA club coefficient ranking

Current
As of 25 August 2022

Rankings

Source:

1999–2017

2017–present

5-year calculation

10-year calculation

Notes

References

Europe
Croatian football clubs in international competitions
Association football in Croatia lists
Yugoslav football clubs in international competitions